Anteros was the god of requited love in Greek mythology.

Anteros may also refer to:

Anteros (butterfly), a genus of butterflies
Anteros Coachworks Inc., an American sports car manufacturer
1943 Anteros, an asteroid
Eros|Anteros, a 2013 album by Belgian band Oathbreaker
Anteros (band), a London-based band

See also
Pope Anterus, a 3rd-century pope
Antergos, a Linux distribution